Leszek Władysław Lubicz-Nycz (20 August 1899 – 22 September 1939) was a Polish fencer. He won a bronze medal in the team sabre event at the 1932 Summer Olympics. Lubicz-Nycz served in the Polish Army between 1918 and his death in 1939. He was killed in action near Warsaw during the September Campaign.

References

External links
 Profile at the Polish Olympic Committee website

1899 births
1939 deaths
Polish male fencers
Olympic fencers of Poland
Fencers at the 1932 Summer Olympics
Olympic bronze medalists for Poland
Olympic medalists in fencing
People from Brzesko
Polish military personnel killed in World War II
Medalists at the 1932 Summer Olympics
Sportspeople from Lesser Poland Voivodeship
Polish Austro-Hungarians
People from the Kingdom of Galicia and Lodomeria
Polish Army officers
19th-century Polish people
20th-century Polish people